Nakhodka is a village (selo) in Tazovsky District of Yamalo-Nenets Autonomous Okrug, Russia, located on the Taz River. Population: 2,676 (2005 est.).

There is big natural gas and oil field near the village, which is being developed by LUKoil.

The climate in the village is very harsh.

References

Rural localities in Yamalo-Nenets Autonomous Okrug